Prairie View is a locality in Excelsior Rural Municipality No. 166 in the province of Saskatchewan, Canada. Located east of highway 628, approximately 15 km north of Rush Lake.

See also
 List of communities in Saskatchewan
 List of ghost towns in Saskatchewan

References

Unincorporated communities in Saskatchewan
Excelsior No. 166, Saskatchewan
Ghost towns in Saskatchewan